The Heroes may refer to:
 The Heroes (fantasy novel), a 2011 fantasy novel by Joe Abercrombie
 The Heroes (1916 film), a 1916 short comedy film starring Oliver Hardy
 The Heroes (1973 film), a 1973 film starring Rod Steiger 
 The Heroes (1980 film), a 1980 Hong Kong film
 The Heroes (1994 film), a 1994 Italian comedy film
 The Heroes (miniseries), a 1989 Australian-British television war film based on Operation Jaywick starring John Bach and Jason Donovan
 The Heroes (band), a British rock band active in the early 1980s
 "The Heroes" (1998), a song by Shed Seven from the album Let It Ride
 "The Heroes" (1947), a Nelson Algren story in The Neon Wilderness

See also
 Heroes (disambiguation)
 The Hero (disambiguation)